Krystin Hunter is a Canadian sound editor. She is a two-time winner of the Canadian Screen Award for Best Sound Editing, winning at the 9th Canadian Screen Awards in 2021 for Akilla's Escape and at the 10th Canadian Screen Awards in 2022 for Scarborough.

She was also a nominee in 2021 for Funny Boy, and was previously nominated at the 8th Canadian Screen Awards in 2020 for Goalie.

References

External links

Canadian sound editors
Women sound editors
Best Sound Editing Genie and Canadian Screen Award winners
Canadian women in film
Living people
Year of birth missing (living people)